

Presidents of the National Assembly of the Central African Republic

President of the Representative Council

President of the Territorial Assembly

President of the Territorial Assembly/Constituent and Legislative Provisional Assembly

Presidents of the Legislative Assembly (later the National Assembly)

Presidents of the National Transitional Council

Presidents of the National Assembly

References

See also
National Assembly (Central African Republic)

Politics of the Central African Republic
Central African Republic, National Assembly